John Howard Cordle (11 October 1912 – 23 November 2004) was a British Conservative politician who sat in the House of Commons from 1959 to 1977.

Life and career

Cordle, the son of Ernest William Cordle, was educated at the City of London School and became managing director of E. W. Cordle and Son Ltd. in 1946. He was also a member of Lloyd's of London. He served as a member of the Church Assembly 1946–53, as a director of the Church Society from 1951 and of the Church of England Newspaper from 1959.

Cordle contested The Wrekin in 1951. He was Member of Parliament for Bournemouth East and Christchurch from 1959 to 1974, and after boundary changes, for Bournemouth East from 1974 to 1977, when he resigned as a result of the John Poulson scandal. David Atkinson was elected as his successor in the subsequent by-election.

Family

Cordle was married three times. He was first married in 1938 (divorced 1956) to Grace Lucy Walkey (1918-2021); by this marriage, he had issue (four sons and a daughter), of whom only two (or three) sons outlived him. 
He married secondly in 1957 (divorced 1971) to Venetia Caroline Maynard (b. 22 March 1936), daughter of Lt-Col. Alister Maynard, by whom he had issue (one son and three daughters), including Marina, Viscountess Cowdray. He married thirdly in 1976 to Terttu Heikura, his children's nanny who was 35 years his junior, by whom he had two sons.

Notes 
Footnotes

References

Sources 
Times Guide to the House of Commons October 1974

The Times obituary, 24 November 2004. Retrieved 17 November 2008.
Daily Telegraph obituary 24 November 2004.  Retrieved 17 November 2008.
Andrew Roth. The Guardian obituary 25 November 2004. Retrieved 17 November 2008.
John Barnes. The Independent obituary 9 December 2004. Retrieved 17 November 2008.
Genealogy of Grace Lucy Walkey, the first Mrs Cordle

External links 
 

1912 births
2004 deaths
Conservative Party (UK) MPs for English constituencies
People educated at the City of London School
UK MPs 1959–1964
UK MPs 1964–1966
UK MPs 1966–1970
UK MPs 1970–1974
UK MPs 1974
UK MPs 1974–1979